Mutianyu Village is a settlement at the foot of the Mutianyu section of the Great Wall of China. It, along with the villages of Beigou, Tianxianyu and Xinying, comprise the Township of Bohai.

References

External links
 

Geography of Beijing
Great Wall of China